Events from the year 1782 in Russia

Incumbents
 Monarch – Catherine II

Events
 Bronze Horseman, sculpture of Peter the Great, unveiled in St. Petersburg
 The Minor (Fonvizin play) first performed
 Order of Saint Vladimir established
 Siberia Governorate, Orenburg Governorate, and others dissolved as part of a general administrative reorganization

Births
 Stepan Andreyevskiy - general
 Constantine IV, Prince of Mukhrani - Georgian nobleman, Russian general
 Philaret Drozdov - Russian Orthodox Metropolitan of Moscow
 Yevgeny Golovin - general
 Afanasy Grigoriev - architect
 Pyotr Kotlyarevsky - hero of the Russo-Turkish War and Russo-Persian War
 Vasili Krasovsky - writer
 Orest Kiprensky - portrait artist
 Yakov Kolokolnikov-Voronin - artist
 Valerian Madatov - Armenian prince, Russian general
 Pavel Martynov - general
 Ivan Paskevich - general
 Konstantin Poltoratsky - general
 Sophie Swetchine - mystic
 Prince Teimuraz of Georgia - scholar and historian
 Fyodor Ivanovich Tolstoy - nobleman and traveller
 Georg Andreas von Rosen - general
 Ferdinand von Tiesenhausen - nobleman and soldier
 Alexander Varnek - portrait artist
 Mikhail Semyonovich Vorontsov - general

Deaths
 Elizabeth Antonovna of Brunswick - member of the Russian royal family
 Vasily Dolgorukov-Krymsky - general and Governor-General of Moscow
 Vasily Neyolov - architect

References

1782 in Russia
Years of the 18th century in the Russian Empire